Anthony John Spilotro (May 19, 1938 – June 14, 1986), nicknamed "Tony the Ant", was an American mobster and high ranking member for the Chicago Outfit in Las Vegas during the 1970s and '80s.

Spilotro managed the Outfit's illegal casino profits (the "skim") when four of the casinos, The Stardust, The Fremont, The Hacienda, and The Marina, were managed by Frank Rosenthal, replacing Outfit member John Roselli in Las Vegas. He was the leader of the "Hole in the Wall Gang", which he formed in Las Vegas when he moved there in 1971.

Spilotro eventually ran afoul of his organized crime overseers who disapproved of his handling of their Las Vegas affairs, and who then arranged his murder on June 14, 1986. Spilotro served as the basis for the character Nicky Santoro in Martin Scorsese's 1995 film Casino.

Early life
Spilotro was born in Chicago, Illinois, the fourth of six children to Pasquale "Patsy" Spilotro Sr. and Antoinette Spilotro. He attended Burbank Elementary School, and entered Steinmetz High School in 1953. His father had emigrated from Triggiano, Province of Bari, Italy, and had arrived at Ellis Island in 1914. He and his mother ran Patsy's Restaurant, which was frequented by mobsters such as Sam Giancana, Jackie "The Lackey" Cerone, Gus Alex, and Francesco "Frank the Enforcer" Nitti.

Tony and four of his brothers, (John, Vincent, Victor, and Michael) became involved in criminal activity starting at an early age. The remaining brother, "Patrick" Pasquale Jr., became a dentist. Spilotro was a boyhood friend of Frank Cullotta, and started a criminal career together as teenagers, engaging in theft, burglary, and murder.

He was nicknamed "Tony the Ant" by the media after FBI Special Agent William Roemer referred to Spilotro as "that little pissant." Since the media couldn't use "pissant", they shortened it to the "Ant".

The Hole in the Wall Gang
In 1971, Spilotro moved to Las Vegas to manage the affairs of the Chicago Outfit there. He formed the "Hole in the Wall" Gang, a group of experienced thieves, safecrackers and killers. The crew became known in the media as the "Hole in the Wall Gang" because of its penchant for gaining entry to homes and buildings by drilling through the exterior walls and ceilings of the locations they burglarized. In early 1979, Frank Cullotta moved to Las Vegas to join Spilotro.

On July 4, 1981, the Hole in the Wall Gang robbed Bertha's Gifts & Home Furnishings on East Sahara Avenue in Las Vegas. The robbery was a bust as much of the gang was arrested, including Cullotta, Joe Blasko, Leo Guardino, Ernest Davino, Lawrence Neumann and Wayne Matecki—each charged with burglary, conspiracy to commit burglary, attempted grand larceny and possession of burglary tools.

Around this time, Spilotro had an affair with Frank Rosenthal's wife, Geri McGee.

In 1982, Cullotta was imprisoned and approached by the FBI with a wiretap of Spilotro talking with someone about "having to clean our dirty laundry", which Cullotta took as an insinuated contract on his life. Due to this, in July 1982, Cullotta finalized an agreement with the prosecutors. In September 1983, Spilotro was indicted for conspiracy and obstruction of justice in the Sherwin "Jerry" Lisner murder and released on $100,000 bail. At a trial in October 1983, Cullotta admitted that he was involved in over 300 crimes, including four murders, perjury, robberies and burglaries. He also testified that Spilotro, his boss in Las Vegas, ordered him to make a telephone call that lured one of the 1962 murder victims, William McCarthy, to a fast food restaurant. In 1962, Cullotta had killed William McCarthy and James Miraglia, who were found dead in the trunk of a car on May 14, 1962. McCarthy's head had been placed in a vise and his throat slashed, while Miraglia strangled. Spilotro was acquitted later that year. Spilotro's defense attorney was future Las Vegas mayor Oscar Goodman.

Members of Hole in the Wall Gang

Michael Spilotro
Herbie Blitzstein
Peter Basile
Sherwin (Jerry) Lisner
Frank Cullotta  
Joseph Cusumano
Samuel Cusumano
John Spilotro
Joseph D'Argento
Ernesto "Ernie" Davino 
John P (Jackie) Cerone
Leonardo "Leo" Guardino 
Frank DeLegge
Michael LaJoy
Ernest Lehnigg 
Wayne Matecki
"Crazy Larry" Neumann
Butch Pancsko
Leonard (Congo) Brooks
Paul (Peanuts) Pancsko 
John (Pops) Pancsko
Edward (Butch) Pancsko
Salvatore "Sonny" Romano 
Gerald Tomasczek 
Carl Urbanotti  
Joseph Blasko
Salvatore Romano
Paul "The Indian" Schiro
Joseph "Joe Blow" Schembri
Luca "Jimmy" Domingo

Death and aftermath
Spilotro and his brother Michael disappeared on June 14, 1986, after they drove away together from Michael's Oak Park home. Michael's wife, Anne, reported both brothers missing on June 16. Michael's car, a 1986 Lincoln, was recovered several days later in a motel parking lot near O'Hare International Airport. On June 22, their bodies were found, one on top of the other and stripped down to their undershorts, buried in a cornfield in the Willow Slough preserve near Enos, Indiana. The freshly turned earth had been noticed by a farmer who thought that the remains of a deer killed out of season had been buried there by a poacher, and notified authorities. An autopsy completed on June 24 identified their cause of death as blunt force trauma, and ascertained that they had been dead since June 14. They were identified by dental charts supplied by their dentist brother, Patrick Spilotro. The two were buried in a family plot at Queen of Heaven Cemetery in Hillside, Illinois, on June 27.

In January 1986, in the wake of the imprisonment of Joseph Aiuppa and John Cerone for skimming Las Vegas casino profits, a meeting was held at the Czech Lodge in North Riverside, Illinois. Most of the 'upper echelon' were there, including Outfit boss Tony "Joe Batters" Accardo. Accardo decided to appoint Samuel Carlisi as the "Street Boss" in charge of Outfit operations to replace Aiuppa. Carlisi told the group that Accardo would stay on as consigliere and would have final say, as well as Gus Alex staying head of the connection guys. He then went on to the first problem: Spilotro, and how things had gone down since he took over Vegas. Mobster and mob enforcer Rocco Infelice said, "Hit him." Everyone else at the meeting agreed. Spilotro was replaced in Las Vegas by Donald "The Wizard of Odds" Angelini.

Although the original reports stated the Spilotros were beaten and buried in the Enos, Indiana, cornfield, mobster Nicholas Calabrese testified at the "Operation Family Secrets" in 2007 that the brothers were killed in a Bensenville, Illinois basement first, where the Spilotros believed Michael would be inducted into The Outfit, then their bodies were transported to the cornfield. According to court testimony, when Tony entered the basement and realized what was about to occur, he asked if he could "say a prayer".

No arrests were made until April 25, 2005, when 14 members of the Chicago Outfit (including reputed boss James Marcello) were indicted for 18 murders, including the Spilotros'. The suspected murderers included capo Albert Tocco from Chicago Heights, Illinois, who was sentenced to 200 years in prison in 1990, after his wife testified against him. She testified that, in 1986, she drove her husband from an Indiana cornfield where he told her he had just buried Spilotro.

On May 18, 2007, the star witness in the government's case against 14 Chicago mob figures, Nicholas Calabrese, pleaded guilty to taking part in a conspiracy that included 18 murders. Under heavy security, Calabrese admitted that he took part in planning or carrying out 14 of the murders including the Spilotro killings. He became the key witness against his brother, Frank Calabrese, Sr., and other major mob figures charged in the government's Family Secrets Trial. Calabrese agreed to testify after the FBI showed him DNA evidence linking him to the murder of fellow hit-man John Fecarotta who was also allegedly involved in the Spilotro slayings.

In September 2007 Frank Calabrese, Sr. and four other men—Marcello, Joseph Lombardo, Paul "The Indian" Schiro, and former Chicago police officer Anthony "Twan" Doyle—were convicted of mob-related crimes. On September 27, 2007 Marcello was found guilty by a federal jury in the murders of both Spilotro brothers. On February 5, 2009 Marcello was sentenced to life imprisonment for the Spilotro murders, and United States District Judge James Zagel agreeing with the presentation made by federal prosecutor Markus Funk, also found Marcello responsible for the D'Andrea murder as well even though the jury had deadlocked on that count. On March 26, 2009 Nicholas Calabrese was sentenced to 12 years and four months imprisonment.

In a 2010 interview with Maxim magazine, while promoting the opening of the Las Vegas Mob Experience at the Tropicana Hotel, Tony Spilotro's son Vincent claimed that the real target of those who killed the Spilotro brothers was Michael Spilotro and that Tony was killed to prevent any revenge.

Suspect in gangland slayings
By the time of his death in 1986, the FBI suspected Spilotro was involved in 22 or 25 murders including:

 The murder of Sam DeStefano on April 14, 1973.
 The murder of former Chicago Outfit boss Sam Giancana on June 19, 1975.

In popular culture
In the 1980s NBC series Crime Story, the character of mobster Ray Luca is based on Anthony Spilotro.
Martin Scorsese's film Casino (1995) is based on the Las Vegas careers of Spilotro and Rosenthal, on whom the characters Nicholas "Nicky" Santoro (played by Joe Pesci) and Ace Rothstein (played by Robert De Niro) were based. Nearing the end of the film, Nicky and his brother Dominick (Philip Suriano), based on Tony's brother Michael Spilotro, are shown being beaten with metal baseball bats and buried alive in an Indiana cornfield by their associate Frank Marino (Frank Vincent), based on Frank Cullotta, and the rest of Nicky's crew.

See also
List of solved missing person cases: pre-2000

References

Further reading
 Coen, Jeff. Family Secrets: The Case That Crippled the Chicago Mob Chicago Review Press, Incorporated: 2009. 
 Griffin, Dennis. The Battle for Las Vegas : The Law Vs. the Mob  Huntington Press: 2006. 
 Griffin, Dennis. Cullotta. The Life of a Chicago Criminal, Las Vegas Mobster, and Government Witness Huntington Press: 2007. 
 Pileggi, Nicholas. Casino: Love and Honor in Las Vegas, 
 Roemer, William F., Jr. The Enforcer – Spilotro: The Chicago Mob's Man in Las Vegas,

External links
 Anthony "Tony" Spilotro Archives
 Chicago Sun-Times: Ex-mobster weighs in on latest case  by Robert C. Herguth
 Anthony "Tony The Ant" Spilotoro's FBI File
 The Free Information Society – Biography
 
 FBI file on Anthony Spilotro on the Internet Archive

1938 births
1980s missing person cases
1986 deaths
1986 murders in the United States
American burglars
Burials in Illinois
Burials in Indiana
Chicago Outfit mobsters
Deaths by beating in the United States
Formerly missing people
Missing person cases in Illinois
Male murder victims
Murdered American gangsters of Italian descent
People acquitted of murder
People from Oak Park, Illinois
People murdered by the Chicago Outfit
People murdered in Illinois
People of Apulian descent